David Onri Anderson is a Tennessee-born painter, musician and curator of French/Algerian ancestry, who emerged from the Nashville arts community in the mid-1990s. His large scale paintings are heavily influenced by nature, eastern Tantra artwork and Cosmic Philosophy and are sometimes accompanied by installation elements such as raw earth. His works frequently explore the spaces between oneness and variation. In 2016, he was awarded the Anny Gowa Purchase Award from Watkins College of Art, Design & Film and in 2017 considered by the publication Nashville Scene as Best Emerging Painter.

In early 2019, the artist's musical project, the metal-influenced Dream pop band called Onri (with fellow members Aaron Harper and Zack Rafuls), released their sixteen-track debut album, "Bed Bop".

Solo exhibitions
2019 Patrick Painter Gallery “Apple Core Peace Temple” 
2018 "Earthbound" Elephant Gallery, Nashville 
2017 "Rice, Beans & Incense" Atlanta Contemporary, Atlanta  
2017 "I’m So Glad I Got My Own" (Natural High), Fluorescent Gallery, Atlanta HUM, 
2017 The Browsing Room, Nashville 
2016 Paper Mind, Bijan Ferdwosi, Nashville 
2016 "What’s In My Soup?" BFA Thesis Show,  Brownlee O. Currey Gallery, Watkins College of Art, Nashville 
2016 "Burial Boogie Woogie" 40AU, Nashville, TN 
2015 Pop-Up Solo Exhibition, Oz Arts Center, Nashville 
2014 "Desire Trap" - WAG, Nashville

Group exhibitions
2018 Patrick Painter Gallery "Plastic Fantastic Lover" (works by David Onri Anderson & Carlson Hatton)

Reviews and articles
2019 Hyperallergic “A Clown-Themed Art Show” by Emma Orlow 
2019 Artspace “5 Shows By Emerging Artists” by Jake Sillen
2018 Art in America - “Earthbound” exhibit reviewed by Laura Hutson Hunter 
2018 Number Inc.(interview written by Jesse Butcher 
2017 USA TODAY (Tennessean)

References

External links
Official site

American contemporary artists
Performance art in Los Angeles
Artists from Tennessee
California Institute of the Arts alumni
1993 births
Living people